Tephritis subradiata is a species of tephritid or fruit flies in the genus Tephritis of the family Tephritidae.

Distribution
Mexico.

References

Tephritinae
Insects described in 1900
Diptera of North America